Fond du Lac Dene Nation is a Dene First Nation located in the boreal forest area of northern Saskatchewan, Canada. The main settlement is Fond-du-Lac, situated on the east side of Lake Athabasca. It is a remote fly-in community. The population in 2011 was 874, mainly of Dene and Métis descent. 705 residents selected Dene as their mother tongue in 2011.

Fond du Lac is a geographic name meaning "far end of the lake" in the French language (literally it translates as "bottom of the lake").

History

Founded as a community over 150 years ago, by Denesuline First Nations in pursuit of furs, fishing, hunting and trapping the community has seen little changes. Many in the community can trace their ancestral roots to the early 19th century. "Living off the land" is still a way of life in Fond-du-Lac.

Many of the residents are descendants of the Maurice's Band who signed an adhesion to Treaty 8 in 1899. The Maurice's Band (Chief Maurice Piche's Band) split in 1949 forming the Fond-du-Lac Band and the Black Lake Band.

Reserves

Fond du Lac Dene Nation is a First Nation band government with 6 territories around the eastern area of Lake Athabasca.
Population 0 in 2011.
Fond du Lac 231 is   borders the Athabasca Sand Dunes Provincial Park on the McFarlane River. Population 0 in 2011.
Population 0 in 2011.
Population 0 in 2011.

Fond du Lac had a total registered membership of 1,895 with 1,066 members residing on-reserve and 829 members residing at locations off-reserve in September 2013. The Fond du Lac First Nation is a member of the Prince Albert Grand Council.

Demographics

Economy
The main enterprise today in Fond du Lac is working in the mineral and other resource extraction business. Others follow a tradition of fishing, hunting, and trapping as well as providing guide services to the many fishing camps in the area.

Transportation
There are minimal roads within the community and no year-round roads to the community.  It is only accessible by air (through the Fond-du-Lac Airport), inland water transport and snowmobile. Common transportation for community members includes driving large trucks and ATVs better known as four wheelers. In the winter there is a seasonal ice road with access to Uranium City and Stony Rapids (with the latter community in turn connected to the rest of the province via another ice road). The community greatly relies on aircraft and barges for supplies and services.  In the winter the occasional truck will venture in on the ice road with supplies.

Climate
Fond-du-Lac has a typical northern Saskatchewan subarctic climate (Köppen Dfc) with long, frigid winters and short, mild to warm summers.

References

First Nations in Saskatchewan
Unincorporated communities in Saskatchewan
Hudson's Bay Company trading posts
Dene communities
Road-inaccessible communities of Saskatchewan
Lake Athabasca